The 1985 New York Yankees season was the 83rd season for the Yankees. The team only played 161 games, came in second place in the American League Eastern Division with a record of 97-64, and finished 2 games behind the Toronto Blue Jays. The Yankees did not qualify for the postseason, marking the 1985 Yankees a failed season. New York was managed by Yogi Berra and Billy Martin. The Yankees played at Yankee Stadium.

Offseason
November 5, 1984: Matt Keough was released by the Yankees.
 December 4, 1984: Ray Fontenot and Brian Dayett were traded by the Yankees to the Chicago Cubs for Ron Hassey, Porfi Altamirano, Rich Bordi, and Henry Cotto.
 December 5, 1984: Rick Cerone was traded by the Yankees to the Atlanta Braves for Brian Fisher.
 December 5, 1984: Stan Javier, Jay Howell, José Rijo, Eric Plunk, and Tim Birtsas were traded by the Yankees to the Oakland Athletics for Rickey Henderson, Bert Bradley and cash.
 December 20, 1984: Steve Kemp, Tim Foli, and cash were traded by the Yankees to the Pittsburgh Pirates for Jay Buhner, Dale Berra and Alfonso Pulido.  Berra became the first player since 1925, when Earle Mack played for his father Connie Mack for the Philadelphia Athletics, to play for his father as manager.
December 27, 1984: Ed Whitson was signed as a free agent by the Yankees.
February 27, 1985: Toby Harrah was traded by the Yankees to the Texas Rangers for Billy Sample and a player to be named later. The Rangers completed the deal by sending Eric Dersin (minors) to the Yankees on July 14.

Regular season
 Rickey Henderson set a new club record by stealing 80 bases in one season. The previous mark had stood since 1914.
Henderson also scored 146 runs. It was the most in the Major Leagues since Ted Williams scored 150 runs in 1949. In addition, Rickey Henderson became the first player since Lou Gehrig in 1936 to amass more runs in a season than games played.
 Don Mattingly became the first Yankee since Joe DiMaggio to have back to back 200 hit seasons.
 Mattingly's 48 doubles were the most since Lou Gehrig hit 52 in 1927.
 Mattingly was the AL MVP and RBI leader with 145.  Mattingly hit for a .324 average with 35 home runs.
 Dave Winfield became the first Yankee since Yogi Berra to achieve four straight 100 RBI seasons. Berra did it from 1953 to 1956.
 On April 28, the Yankees fired Yogi Berra as manager 16 games into the season, only hours after being swept by the Chicago White Sox in a three-game series at Comiskey Park.  Owner George Steinbrenner did not fire Berra personally, but instead dispatched general manager Clyde King to deliver the news. Berra was replaced by Billy Martin, whom he replaced as manager after the 1983 season. It became the fourth of Martin's five stints as Yankee skipper. Berra vowed after the slight to never again set foot in Yankee Stadium as long as Steinbrenner owned the team
 On September 22, while at a hotel bar in Baltimore, Maryland, pitcher Ed Whitson broke manager Billy Martin's arm after a heated argument that spread to other parts of the hotel. Whitson's Yankee tenure was also memorable for constantly being heckled and booed during home games.
 On October 5, the Yankees entered the next-to-last game of the season against the division-leading Toronto Blue Jays trailing them by two games. However, the Jays, led by pitcher Doyle Alexander, triumphed 5-1, clinching their first division title in franchise history.
 On October 6, Phil Niekro shut out the Blue Jays 8-0 for his 300th major league win.  He did not throw his trademark knuckleball until the final pitch of the game, striking out Jeff Burroughs.

Season standings

Record vs. opponents

Notable transactions
June 3, 1985: Shane Turner was drafted by the Yankees in the 6th round of the 1985 Major League Baseball Draft.
August 24, 1985: Jim Leyritz was signed by the Yankees as an amateur free agent.
September 13, 1985: Bernie Williams was signed by the Yankees as an amateur free agent.
September 15, 1985: Jim Deshaies and players to be named later were traded by the Yankees to the Houston Astros for Joe Niekro, who joined his brother Phil Niekro in the rotation. The Yankees completed the deal by sending Neder Horta (minors) to the Astros on September 24 and Dody Rather (minors) to the Astros on January 11, 1986.

Roster

Game log

Regular season

|-

|-

|-

|- style="background:#bbcaff;"
| – || July 16 || ||colspan=10 |1985 Major League Baseball All-Star Game at Hubert H. Humphrey Metrodome in Minneapolis
|-

|-

|-

|-

|- style="text-align:center;"
| Legend:       = Win       = Loss       = PostponementBold = Yankees team member

Player stats

Batting

Starters by position
Note: Pos = Position; G = Games played; AB = At Bats; H = Hits; Avg. = Batting average; HR = Home runs; RBI = Runs batted in

Other batters
Note: G = Games pitched; AB = At bats; H = Hits; Avg. = Batting average; HR = Home runs; RBI = Runs batted in

Pitching

Starting pitchers 
Note: G = Games pitched; IP = Innings pitched; W = Wins; L = Losses; ERA = Earned run average; SO = Strikeouts

Other pitchers 
Note: G = Games pitched; IP = Innings pitched; W = Wins; L = Losses; ERA = Earned run average; SO = Strikeouts

Relief pitchers 
Note: G = Games pitched; W = Wins; L = Losses; SV = Saves; ERA = Earned run average; SO = Strikeouts

Awards and honors
 Don Baylor – Roberto Clemente Award
 Ron Guidry – Gold Glove
 Rickey Henderson – American League Leader Stolen Bases (80)
 Rickey Henderson – Major League Baseball Leader Runs Scored (146)
 Rickey Henderson – Silver Slugger Award
 Don Mattingly – American League Most Valuable Player
 Don Mattingly – American League Leader RBI (145)
 Don Mattingly – Gold Glove
 Don Mattingly – Silver Slugger Award
 Dave Winfield – Silver Slugger Award
 Dave Winfield – Gold Glove

All-Star Game
 Don Mattingly, first base
 Dave Winfield, outfield
 Rickey Henderson, outfield

Farm system 

LEAGUE CHAMPIONS: Oneonta, GCL Yankees

References

External links
1985 New York Yankees at Baseball Reference
1985 New York Yankees team page at www.baseball-almanac.com

New York Yankees seasons
New York Yankees
New York Yankees
1980s in the Bronx